The three-toed snake-tooth skink (Coeranoscincus reticulatus) is a species of skink in the family Scincidae. It is endemic to south-eastern Queensland and north-eastern New South Wales, Australia. It occurs in subtropical rainforest, wet sclerophyll forest, and montane forest on rich dark soils on the coast and adjacent ranges; some coastal/island populations (Fraser Island and Cooloola) occur on pale sands in lowlands.

Coeranoscincus reticulatus measure  in snout–vent length. The limbs are reduced with three digits in each.

References

Coeranoscincus
Skinks of Australia
Endemic fauna of Australia
Reptiles of New South Wales
Reptiles of Queensland
Reptiles described in 1873
Taxa named by Albert Günther
Taxonomy articles created by Polbot